Fresh Aire 7 was the seventh album in new age musical group Mannheim Steamroller's Fresh Aire series.  The album was originally released in 1990 and peaked at #77 on the Billboard album chart in December of that year.  Its theme is based on the number seven. The album won a Grammy Award for best New Age album in 1991.

Track listing
"Conjuring the Number 7" – 4:02
"Sunday the 7th Day" – 3:52
"The 7 Colours of the Rainbow" – 5:31
"The 7 C's" – 0:25
"The 7 Metals of Alchemy" – 3:26
"The 7 Chakras of the Body: Chakra 1" – 1:16
"The 7 Chakras of the Body: Chakra 2" – 4:16
"The 7 Chakras of the Body: Chakra 3" – 3:21
"The 7 Chakras of the Body: Chakra 4" – 5:31
"The 7 Chakras of the Body: Chakra 5" – 4:24
"The 7 Chakras of the Body: Chakra 6" – 3:40
"The 7 Chakras of the Body: Chakra 7" – 3:56
"The 7 Stars of the Big Dipper" – 3:02

References

1991 albums
Grammy Award for Best New Age Album
7
American Gramaphone albums